Town Mill is the name of a number of mills in the United Kingdom.

Windmills
In the United Kingdom
Town Mill, Biddenden, a windmill in Kent
Town Mill, Bluntisham, a windmill in Cambridgeshire
Town Mill, Margate, a windmill in Margate, Kent
Town Mill, Sandwich, a windmill in Sandwich, Kent
Town Mill, Shoreham, a windmill in West Sussex
Town Mill, Southwold, a windmill in Suffolk
Town Mill, Swindon, a windmill in Wiltshire

In the United States
Town Mill, Edgartown, a windmill in Massachusetts

Watermills

Town Mill, Edenbridge, on the River Eden, Kent
Town Mill, Guildford, on the River Wey, Surrey
Town Mill, King's Lynn, on the Gaywood River, Norfolk
Town Mill, Lyme Regis, on the River Lym, Dorset
Town Mill, Mansfield], on the River Trent, Nottinghamshire
Town Mill, Partick, on the Molendinar Burn, Dunbartonshire
Town Mill, Sheffield, on the River Sheaf, Yorkshire
Town Mill, Tonbridge, on the River Medway, Kent
Town Mill, Whitchurch, on the River Test, Hampshire